Denise Anne Thomas (born 22 December 1979) is a former international Association football player and CrossFit practitioner. She represented Ireland at senior level and played club football in England with Doncaster Belles and Leeds United, as well as in America with Boston Renegades.

Thomas, from Rotherham, began her career in the youth ranks of Chesterfield Ladies. She moved on to Doncaster Belles and played in the Yorkshire club's 2000 FA Women's Cup Final defeat. Thomas moved to America that summer on a college scholarship to Central Connecticut State University. She was named Northeast Conference Rookie of the Year in 2000 and Player of the Year in 2001.

In February 2002 Thomas returned from America and signed for Sunderland, who were bottom of the Premier League National Division. When Sunderland were relegated she moved to Leeds United and enrolled at the Football Association (FA) Player Development Centre at Loughborough University. She had also been approached by Birmingham City manager Marcus Bignot during the summer. In the middle of the 2002–03 season Thomas left Leeds and went back to America to complete her degree.

Thomas joined W-League club Boston Renegades for their 2005 season. In 2008, she was introduced to CrossFit and began competing the following year.

References

External links
Denise Thomas at UEFA

1979 births
Living people
Republic of Ireland women's association footballers
Republic of Ireland women's international footballers
Doncaster Rovers Belles L.F.C. players
Leeds United Women F.C. players
Sunderland A.F.C. Ladies players
FA Women's National League players
Footballers from Rotherham
CrossFit athletes
Women's association football midfielders
Central Connecticut Blue Devils women's soccer players
USL W-League (1995–2015) players
Boston Renegades players
Irish expatriate sportspeople in the United States
Expatriate women's soccer players in the United States